The Shropshire Royal Horse Artillery was a Territorial Force Royal Horse Artillery battery that was formed in Shropshire in 1908 from the Shropshire Battery of the 1st Shropshire and Staffordshire Artillery Volunteers, Royal Garrison Artillery of the Volunteer Force. It saw active service during the First World War on the Western Front in 1917 and 1918 as part of an Army Field Artillery Brigade. A second line battery, 2/1st Shropshire RHA, also served on the Western Front in 1917 and 1918 as part of another Army Field Artillery Brigade. It was reconstituted post-war as a medium artillery battery and served as such in the Second World War.

History

Formation
The Territorial Force (TF) was formed on 1 April 1908 following the enactment of the Territorial and Reserve Forces Act 1907 (7 Edw.7, c.9) which combined and re-organised the old Volunteer Force, the Honourable Artillery Company and the Yeomanry. On formation, the TF contained 14 infantry divisions and 14 mounted yeomanry brigades. Each yeomanry brigade included a horse artillery battery and an ammunition column.

On 18 March 1908, Shropshire Royal Horse Artillery (Territorial Force) was proposed to be raised from the Shropshire Battery of the 1st Shropshire and Staffordshire Artillery Volunteers, RGA. This was the only one of the new horse artillery batteries (other than those of the Honourable Artillery Company) that pre-existed the establishment of the Territorial Force in 1908.  It was recognized by the Army Council on 7 May 1908.  The unit consisted of
 Battery HQ at Shrewsbury
 Shropshire RHA Battery at Shrewsbury
 Welsh Border Mounted Brigade Ammunition Column at Church Stretton 
The unit was equipped with four Ehrhardt 15-pounder guns and allocated as artillery support to the Welsh Border Mounted Brigade.

First World War

In accordance with the Territorial and Reserve Forces Act 1907 (7 Edw.7, c.9), which brought the Territorial Force into being, the TF was intended to be a home defence force for service during wartime and members could not be compelled to serve outside the country. However, on the outbreak of war on 4 August 1914, many members volunteered for Imperial Service. Therefore, TF units were split into 1st Line (liable for overseas service) and 2nd Line (home service for those unable or unwilling to serve overseas) units. 2nd Line units performed the home defence role, although in fact most of these were also posted abroad in due course.

1/1st Shropshire
The 1st Line battery was embodied with the Welsh Border Mounted Brigade on 4 August 1914 at the outbreak of the First World War and moved to East Anglia. It joined the 1st Mounted Division in September 1914, replacing 2nd South Midland Mounted Brigade which moved to 2nd Mounted Division.

The battery was re-equipped with four 18-pounders on 30 December 1915 at Beccles. In March 1916, the Welsh Border Mounted Brigade (without the battery) was dismounted and left for Egypt. The brigade was replaced in the 1st Mounted Division by its 2nd line 2/1st Welsh Border Mounted Brigade and the battery remained with the division until August 1916.

2/IV London (Howitzer) Brigade, RFA (T.F.) of 58th (2/1st London) Division was broken up in July 1916 when it batteries were posted to 2/I and 2/II London Brigades, RFA (T.F.) (that is, before the field artillery brigades of the Territorial Force divisions were numbered in a single sequence).  The brigade was reformed for 58th Division in August 1916 as CCXCIII Brigade, Royal Field Artillery (T.F.) with two gun batteries provided by 1/1st Shropshire RHA (A/CCXCIII Battery) and 1/1st Glamorganshire RHA (B/CCXCIII Battery) and two howitzer batteries (C(H) and D(H) of four 4.5" howitzers each). The Brigade Ammunition Column had been redundant since the Welsh Border Mounted Brigade had left, so the men were transferred to the 58th Divisional Trench Mortar Brigade.

CCXCIII Brigade landed at Le Havre on 22 January 1917. On 6 February 1917, D(H) Battery was split between D(H)/CCXC Battery and D(H)/CCXCI Battery; the remainder of the brigade became CCXCIII Army Field Artillery Brigade, RFA, now with two batteries of six 18-pounders and one of four 4.5" howitzers.

At the Armistice, the battery (six 18-pounders) was still with CCXCIII Army Brigade, RFA serving as Army Troops with the First Army.

2/1st Shropshire

Shropshire RHA formed a 2nd line in 1914, initially designated as the Shropshire (Reserve) Battery RHA and later given a fractional designation as 2/1st Shropshire Battery, RHA.

The battery joined the 2nd line 2/1st Welsh Border Mounted Brigade on formation in September 1914. The brigade was posted to Northumberland in January 1915 and attached to the 63rd (2nd Northumberland) Division. In March 1916, the brigade joined the 1st Mounted Division to replace the 1st Line Welsh Border Mounted Brigade which was dismounted for service in Egypt.

The battery (along with 2/1st Berkshire RHA) joined CLVIII Brigade, RFA when it was reformed at Heytesbury, Wiltshire on 13 April 1917. The two RHA batteries provided the manpower for the Brigade Ammunition Column. At this point, the battery had been rearmed with 18-pounders. The brigade disembarked at Boulogne on 24 May 1917 and became an Army Field Brigade. On 6 July 1917, the battery was redesignated as A/CLVIII Battery and 2/1st Berkshire RHA became C/CLVIII Battery.

At the Armistice, the battery (by now made up to six 18-pounders) was still with CLVIII Army Brigade, RFA serving as Army Troops with the Fifth Army.

Interwar
Shropshire RHA was reconstituted in the Territorial Force on 7 February 1920 when it formed a battery (later numbered 240th) in 6th (Cheshire and Shropshire) Medium Brigade, Royal Garrison Artillery and ceased to be a Royal Horse Artillery battery. The rest of the brigade was formed from the 6th Battalion, Cheshire Regiment (T.F.) and the Cheshire Brigade, RFA (T.F.). The unit was later redesignated as 60th (6th Cheshire and Shropshire) Medium Brigade, RA, (TA). In January 1927, 240th Battery regained its sub-title as 240th (Shropshire RHA) Medium Battery, RA (TA).

Second World War

In 1938, 240th (Shropshire RHA) Battery transferred from the 60th Medium Regiment to 51st (Midland) Medium Regiment, and fought with it throughout the Second World War, in 'Arkforce' during the Battle of France, in the Tunisian and Italian campaigns, and finally in Germany at the end of the war.

Postwar
51st (Midland) Medium Rgt was placed in suspended animation in 1946. When it was reformed in the postwar TA as 351st (Midland) Medium Rgt, the Shropshire RHA element instead joined 639th Heavy Regiment as P Battery, later becoming HQ RA of 48th District. In 1967, it became A Squadron (Shropshire RHA) in the Shropshire Yeomanry.

See also

 List of Territorial Force horse artillery batteries 1908

Notes

References

Bibliography
 
 
 
 
 
 
 
 
 
 Derek Harrison with Peter Duckers, Shropshire Royal Horse Artillery 1908–1920, Shrewsbury: Kingswood/Shropshire Regimental Museum, 2006.

External links
Shropshire Regimental Museum
The Royal Horse Artillery on The Long, Long Trail
The Great War Royal Horse Artillery
Extract from war diary of 158 Brigade RFA
The Royal Artillery 1939–45
British Army units from 1945 on

Royal Horse Artillery batteries
Artillery units and formations of World War I
Military units and formations established in 1908
Military units and formations disestablished in 1919
Military units and formations in Shropshire
Military units and formations in Shrewsbury